Stanley was an electoral district of the House of Assembly in the Australian state of South Australia.

First incarnation
The first incarnation of the electoral district of Stanley was created in 1851 to elect a single member to the unicameral South Australian Legislative Council. The seat was abolished in 1857, with William Younghusband having been the sole member for the duration.

Created by the state's Legislative Council Act of 1851, the extent was formally defined as the entirety of the cadastral County of Gawler (excluding the township of Gawler) and County of Stanley as well as a huge swathe of sparsely-settled land to the north, but excluding all of the Eyre and Yorke Peninsulas.

Second incarnation
The second incarnation of the electorate was created by the Electoral Act (No. 20) of the South Australian parliament in 1861 but it was not until the state election of 1862 election that candidates were first elected to represent Stanley. The extent was formally defined as the entirety of the cadastral counties of Gawler and Stanley, the latter being the source of the district name. Thus, at its creation, the electorate stretched from Gulf St Vincent and the Hummocks on the west from Port Gawler up to Redhill, spanning the Adelaide Plains and Mid North to the cadastral counties boundary line in the east – roughly a line passing from Gawler through Stockport and Mintaro to Booborowie.

In the ten years from 1862, the chief polling place was listed as Clare, with subsidiary polling places at Auburn, Mudla Wirra (Gawler), and Baker's Springs (Rhynie).

The Electoral Districts Act (No. 27) in 1872 dramatically changed the boundaries of the district, with the new electoral district of Wooroora being created largely by the excision of Stanley's southernmost half, and the new north western borders for Stanley being significantly extended to include Port Pirie and Port Broughton.

Townships served by the seat of Stanley from 1875 included Port Pirie, Crystal Brook, Clare, Snowtown and Port Broughton.

Members

Election results

References

External links
The 13 electorates from 1902 to 1915: The Adelaide Chronicle

Former electoral districts of South Australia
1862 establishments in Australia
1956 disestablishments in Australia